The Jingyue Yangtze River Bridge is a cable-stayed bridge over the Yangtze River between Jianli County, Hubei Province and Yueyang, Hunan Province in central China. The Bridge opened in June 2010. The bridge crosses the Yangtze River and is one of the largest cable-stayed bridges in the world. The bridge was tolled a few months after opening.

See also
Bridges and tunnels across the Yangtze River
List of longest cable-stayed bridge spans
List of tallest bridges in the world

References 

Bridges in Hunan
Bridges in Hubei
Bridges over the Yangtze River
Cable-stayed bridges in China
Bridges completed in 2010
Transport in Hubei
Transport in Hunan
Toll bridges in China